Catocala abbreviatella is a moth of the  family Erebidae. It is found from Indiana south and west to Texas and Oklahoma and north to Nebraska and Wisconsin.

The wingspan is 40–50 mm. Adults are on wing from July to August depending on the location. There is probably one generation per year .

The larvae feed on Amorpha and possibly Robinia species.

References

External links
Species info

Moths described in 1872
abbreviatella
Moths of North America